Achaea faber is a species of moth of the family Erebidae. It is found in large parts of Africa, including Congo, Gabon, Ghana, Madagascar, Réunion, South Africa and Tanzania.

The larvae have been recorded on banana, citrus and mango.

References

External links
 Genitalia figures of this species have been published in Esperiana, Buchreihe zur Entomologie, 12: 146, figs 26,27.

Achaea (moth)
Moths described in 1894
Erebid moths of Africa
Moths of Réunion